Rowe & Pitman was once one of the largest British stockbrokers.

History
The firm was founded in London in 1895 by stockbrokers George Duncan Rowe and Fred Pitman. It was known in the city as "R & P". In the 1950s, two of the firm's biggest clients were the South African companies Anglo-American Corporation and De Beers Consolidated Mines.

The firm was one of the largest stockbrokers in the City of London in the mid twentieth century before it was taken over by S.G. Warburg. In an article about stockbroking in the UK before the mid-1980s "Big Bang", In December 2011 The Daily Telegraph wrote: "Cazenove is virtually the only name from those days that still survives. All the others – Scrimgeour Vickers, Hoare Govett, even the once mighty Rowe & Pitman – are now lost in the mists of time."

Further reading
 From Diamond Sculls to Golden Handcuffs: A history of Rowe & Pitman, Andrew Lycett (London: Robert Hale, 1999)

References

Financial services companies of the United Kingdom
British companies established in 1895